

Events

February events 
 February 8 – The Washington Bridge Company is granted authority in Washington, D.C., to build the Long Bridge over the Potomac River, a bridge that will eventually be rebuilt to carry the first railroad tracks to cross the river.

May events 
 May 27 – The Kilmarnock and Troon Railway becomes the first railway line in Scotland authorised by Act of Parliament.

July events 
 July 8 through September 18 – Richard Trevithick's steam locomotive Catch Me Who Can is demonstrated in London.

Births

January births
 January 8 – John A. Poor, first president of the Portland Company is born in Andover, Maine (d. 1871).

February births
 February 10 – John Edgar Thomson, president of the Pennsylvania Railroad 1852-1874 (d. 1874).

March births 
 March 19 – Johann Andreas Schubert, builder of the first German steam locomotive, Saxonia, is born in Wernesgrün (d. 1870).

May births 
 May 12 – Joseph Hamilton Beattie, locomotive engineer for London and South Western Railway 1850–1871 (d. 1871), is born.

July births 
 July 25 – Francis Thompson, English architect working chiefly on railways (d. 1895).

Unknown date births
 George Muirson Totten, chief construction engineer for the Panama Railway (d. 1884).

References